Tarzan: The Epic Adventures is an American adventure drama series that aired for one season in syndication from August 28, 1996 until May 25, 1997. It focuses on the character of Tarzan in his early years, after his first exposure to civilization, but before his marriage to Jane.  The inclusion of the character Nicholas Rokoff, and the fact that Tarzan is not yet married, sets this series in-between the two halves of The Return of Tarzan.  The series uses much of the mythology of Edgar Rice Burroughs' books as background material.

This version of Tarzan was filmed in the Sun City resort in South Africa, making it one of the few Tarzan productions to actually film on that continent.

Plot
The series begins with Tarzan, still living in Europe, returning home to Africa to foil the plans of the evil Count Rokoff. After defeating both Rokoff and his accomplice, Mora, queen of the flesh-eating monsters known as Mahars that lives in Pellucidar, a world below the surface of the Earth (Which Tarzan visted in the novel Tarzan at the Earth's Core), Tarzan decides to stay in Africa, and is reunited with his old friend Themba, who joins him in his adventures.

Similar to shows like Hercules: The Legendary Journeys, The Adventures of Sinbad, and The New Adventures of Robin Hood, the series places a heavy emphasis on fantasy. Among the common elements present were evil sorcerers, magical beings, journeys to other realms, and hidden civilizations. The show also had the recurring theme of who Tarzan really was, and the mystery of where Themba's tribe had vanished to.

Cast
 Joe Lara as Tarzan/John Clayton
 Aaron Seville as Themba
 Lydie Denier as Collette de Coude
 Andrew Divoff as Nicholas Rokoff
 Dennis Christopher as Paul D’Arnot
 Ralph Wilcox as Mugambi
 Angela Harry as La
 Cory Everson as Mara

Notes: Lara also played Tarzan in the otherwise unrelated CBS television movie Tarzan in Manhattan. Denier played Jane Porter in the previous Tarzán television series. Some of Tarzan's yells were archived yells by Johnny Weissmuller who played Tarzan in several films in the 1930s and 40s.

Episodes

Planned second season
A second season was planned to air, but with actor Xavier DeClie replacing Lara in the lead, and Julie St. Claire cast as Jane. However, bankruptcy proceedings were initiated against the show's distributor Seagull Entertainment in summer 1997, and a second season was never produced.

Novel

R. A. Salvatore wrote an authorized Tarzan novel based on pilot script which was published as a trade-paperback in 1996, and a mass-market paperback in 1997.

Nikolas Rokoff—Tarzan's nemesis from the first half of The Return of Tarzan—has a stolen crystal amulet with mystical power. The crystal can open gateways to the savage land of Pellucidar, and in so doing allows reptilian humanoids known as Mahars to attack the surface world. Tarzan therefore has to stop not only Rokoff, but also Mora, the Queen of the Mahars.

References

External links
  — pilot
  — series
 Tarzan on Television

 

1990s American drama television series
1996 fantasy novels
First-run syndicated television programs in the United States
Tarzan television series
Period television series
Novels by R. A. Salvatore
English-language television shows
American action adventure television series
American fantasy television series
1996 American television series debuts
1997 American television series endings
Television shows filmed in South Africa